Pedro Bandeira de Luna Filho (born March 9, 1942) is a Brazilian award-winning and best-selling children's novelist and poet, best known as the author of the Os Karas hexalogy of mystery novels which comprise A Droga da Obediência (1984), Pântano de Sangue (1987), Anjo da Morte (1988), A Droga do Amor (1994), Droga de Americana! (2001) and A Droga da Amizade (2014).

Biography
Bandeira was born in Santos, São Paulo, on March 9, 1942. He began as an amateur theater actor and scenic painter until moving to São Paulo in 1961, where he graduated in Advertising at USP. He then found a job as a freelance copywriter for the newspaper Última Hora, until he was hired by Editora Abril in 1972 to write for children. His stories were initially published in specialized magazines until O Dinossauro que Fazia "Au-Au" came out as a stand-alone book in 1983. It was critically and commercially successful, what influenced Bandeira to dedicate himself solely to children's literature.

1984 saw the release of A Droga da Obediência, the first installment of the Os Karas series; as of 2012 it has sold over 1.6 million copies. In 1986 O Fantástico Mistério de Feiurinha was awarded the Prêmio Jabuti, and a film adaptation of the book, directed by Tizuka Yamasaki and starring Xuxa Meneghel, was released in 2009. A Marca de uma Lágrima, which was published in 1985 and is a loose adaptation of Edmond Rostand's play Cyrano de Bergerac, won the APCA Award in 1986.

As of 2012 Bandeira's books (over 80) have sold over 23 million copies. The sixth (and, according to Bandeira, final) installment of the Os Karas series, A Droga da Amizade, came out in 2014. In March 2017 Bandeira announced his first novel intended for adults, Melodia Mortal, written in partnership with infectiologist Dr. Guido Levi. It was released in April 2017 by Editora Rocco.

He currently lives in São Roque with his wife Lia, with whom he had three children.

References

External links
 Biblioteca Pedro Bandeira 

1942 births
Living people
21st-century Brazilian poets
Brazilian journalists
Male journalists
Children's poets
Brazilian children's writers
People from Santos, São Paulo
University of São Paulo alumni
20th-century Brazilian novelists
21st-century Brazilian novelists
Brazilian male poets
Portuguese-language writers
Brazilian male novelists
20th-century Brazilian male writers
People from São Roque, São Paulo